Masud Rana is a fictional character created in 1966 by the writer Qazi Anwar Hussain, who featured him in 469 books (321 novels and 6 short stories). Hussain created the adult spy-thriller series Masud Rana, at first modeled after James Bond, but expanded widely. So far 469 books have been published in this series which has gained a lot of popularity in Bangladesh. Written from the 1960s and continuing to present day, books are published almost every three months by Sheba Prokashoni, one of the most popular publishing houses of Bangladesh. Although Hussain started the series, he no longer writes it. A group of ghostwriters is employed to produce all the new Masud Rana novels.

The Masud Rana books describe the adventures of its eponymous hero Masud Rana, an international espionage agent of Bangladeshi origin, closely resembling James Bond in his expertise with weapons and love for women. Although the sole author of the series was Hussain, it is known that he liberally extracted segments of plots from popular Western spy thrillers from the contemporary period. Nonetheless, the series became a boon for young people in post-war Bangladesh, who had few entertainment alternatives in an era pre-dating cable TV, the Internet and smart phones. The books caused concern among some middle-class parents because of their occasional racy contents, and reading Masud Rana was an activity often frowned upon. The series eventually ran to well over four hundred individual titles.

Masud Rana has also been adapted for one Bengali film and one TV drama.

In July 2018, the Bangladeshi production house Jaaz Multimedia received permission from Hussain to make three movies based on the first three novels of the series. The production house hopes to release the films in the next five years.

Creation and inspiration
The character was created in 1966 by Bangladeshi novelist Hussain in an attempt to write an adult spy thriller for Bangladeshi readers. According to the preface of "Dhongsho-Pahar" (first book in the series), Hussain was inspired and encouraged by his close friend Mahbub Amin.

Hussain took the name for his character from the first name of Hussain's friend, lyricist Masud Karim, and Rana Pratap Singh of the Rajput clan who ruled Mewar, a state in north-western India from 1540 to 1597. Hussain admitted in a 1994 interview that he was heavily influenced by the Ian Fleming character James Bond.

Masud Rana in other media
A full-length feature film about Rana was made in 1974 titled Masud Rana. Masud Parvez, who is known by his stage name Sohel Rana directed and starred in it. The film is based on the story Bishmaron [Amnesia] (which in turn is based on Strictly for Cash.. by James Hadley Chase.) It is the 11th story in the series and was first published in 1967.

Three films based on first three novels from the series are planned. In July 2018, the Jaaz Multimedia production house announced that it was going to make the films based on Dhwangsha Pahar, Bharatnatyam and Swarna Mrigya. "We recently received permission to make films on the widely read Masud Rana series from Qazi Anwar Hussain," the company said. These three movies will be made and released over the course of next five years. The first film, which will be based on Dhongsho-Pahar, will go on shooting floors in January 2019.

The first package drama in the history of Bangladesh, Prachir Periye (Beyond the Wall) was telecast in 1994 and is based on Pishach Dweep (The Island of Evil) with screenplay by Atiqul Haque Chowdhury and stars Bipasha Hayat.

In 2020, Jaaz Multimedia released a Bengali movie, Masud Rana Dhongsho Pahar, directed by Asif Akbar based on the novel Dhangsa Pahar.

Profile and background

Masud Rana, former major of the Bangladesh Army, currently commander stationed for HUMINT at BCI (Bangladesh Counter Intelligence) HQ, Dhaka. He works under direct command of Major General (retired) Rahat Khan of the fictitious Bangladesh Counter Intelligence (BCI).

According to the series, Rana is also founder and director of an international investigating firm named Rana Agency, which is a front cover for BCI in the form of a private investigation agency.

Rana is also the chairman of Saul Shipping Corporation, he took the position after the death of Rebecca Saul.

Early life
Masud Rana was born in Dhaka, Bangladesh, to Justice Imtiaz Chowdhury and Jahanara Imtiaz Chowdhury. He was orphaned at the age of 13 when his parents were killed in a car accident near Chittagong.

After the death of his parents, Rana went to live with his aunt, Ismat Ara, in Fort William, Highland. Later, he briefly attends Eton College.

According to the early Pakistan-era novels, Rana joined the Pakistan Army and graduated from the Royal Military Academy Sandhurst. He started his army career in the infantry (regiment unknown) and went on to become a commando and join Military Intelligence, reaching the rank of major at a young age. He was recruited by Rahat Khan to PCI (later BCI). Major Rana participated in the liberation war of Bangladesh, he fought in the front-line with guerrillas, hiding his real identity and rank. After independence, Rana and Sohel built the BCI from the ashes, with Sohel working in the light and Rana remaining in shadows.

Psychological evaluation
Masud Rana is a unique individual. He appears to be of sound mind and strong principles and spirit. Rana does not fear death. Rana has a remarkable willingness to take near heavy risks. Rana is solitary. He does not console himself by surrounding himself with others. His athletic pursuits tend to be solitary: running, skiing, hiking, swimming, diving, and most remarkably, climbing.

Rana enjoys pushing himself to the limit, both mentally and physically. He is prone to boredom and mild depression when not challenged. Rana enjoys drinking and gambling, although the former seems to be a way for him to test his personal limits at times rather than a vice. Rana has been known to gamble more than he can afford to lose, although he always gambles with a plan and a clear understanding of the odds. Rana has strong interpersonal skills. He can act comfortably in many situations, but does not seek out companionship except, most notably, for sexual recreation. Rana's lone wolf personality-type tends to attract others.

Rana is goal-oriented, but he often seeks these goals in an indirect and secretive way. Rana seems to have an emotional and mental need for multiple layers of reality. He thrives when not revealing all of himself, carefully organizing the aspects of his personality he reveals to others. Thus Rana is excellent as burying information he does not wish to reveal.

Rana seeks structure in his life. He is a man of pattern and habit. He has acquired strong tastes. Though Rana thrives under structure buy yet he finds subtle ways of rebelling against it. Rana uses humor as a shield and a weapon. He is skilled at making cutting remarks that reveal insecurities to others or mock death, danger and risk.

Most importantly, Rana is deeply loyal to institutions. His concept of his nationality is a large part of his identity.

While the world is far from black and white to Rana, he does tend to see it in stark terms of chaos and order, tradition and change. Rana has chosen to identify with order and tradition.

Rana is an excellent candidate for sensational and high risk intelligence, espionage, counter intelligence and covert operation assignments.

Hobbies
Rana excels in solitary sports. He is an avid climber, diver, swimmer and an excellent runner. He does not race cars, but he does enjoy driving very expensive vehicles very fast. He has gambled at many casinos, although never to ruin. He drinks, but not to excess.

Intelligence training
Major Rana accomplished specialized orientations and BCI Covert Operations training. He showed outstanding physical endurance, Logic & Psychological Ops exercises.

Special forces training
Major Rana graduated with mastery in Underwater and Aquatic Warfare training. Being a commando, he is skilled in jungle, desert, Arctic, mountain and urban warfare. He went further and earned certifications for the operating various kind of rotary and fixed wing aircraft including fighter jets, hovercraft, marine assault vessels and armored vehicles. He is also trained in special reconnaissance, sniping, evasive driving, free-falling, hostage rescue and negotiation, human-intelligence gathering and numerous other military skills.

He proved adept at training other candidates, initiating athletic competitions, and fostering a creative environment. He is an excellent trainer in guerrilla warfare, counter-terrorism, hostage rescue, asymmetric warfare and covert reconnaissance.

He proved himself an exceptionally skilled and disciplined student of BCI methods. Rana is skilled with languages, and speaks fluently without accent in Arabic, hebrew, Russian, English  Italian, French and German, and speaks, reads and writes a passable Greek, Spanish, Mandarin, Cantonese and Japanese. Rana has a tendency to come across as arrogant and overly-confident in some situation.

Rana appears as a loner. He works best in broad strokes when given general goals and the freedom to accomplish those goals in the manner he sees fit.
He has been a fine example of discipline and results-oriented action.

Additionally, Rana often appeared visibly bored and restless during more mundane aspects of training. He obviously enjoys risks, enjoys calculating the odds of success, and playing those risks to the edge of failure.

BCI HQ, Dhaka
Rana continued to work as a mission specialist in locations such as the United States, Russia, the United Kingdom, France, Zimbabwe, Italy, Australia, Chili, Myanmar, Thailand, Hong Kong, Norway, Israel, Sweden, Brazil, Egypt, India, Pakistan and many other countries of the world.

Intelligence service
Rana's service with the BCI has been marked by moments of exemplary but risky bravado. While performing his duties with great zeal, Major Rana has often taken it upon himself to expand upon his orders, and, on more than one occasion, to violate them outright.

Foreign agencies
Rana has been a special projects director of the fictional US agency National Underwater & Maritime Agency. He is also an advisor to the British Secret Intelligence Service.

Mercenary / foreign military
Rana has fought around the world as a mercenary, though not for money, for ideology and humanity, knowingly in Palestine, Lebanon, Syria,  Congo, Bosnia, Katanga and Zimbabwe.

He has served on deputation/temporary attachment with the Egyptian Army, as a staff officer in Military Intelligence and a trainer in the Special Forces. He has served with various US Special Operations units such as Force Recon, Special Forces in many joint operations. He has served undercover in the Royal Navy on an assignment from MI6 to foil an anarchist plot, and in the mercenary Katanga Army to rescue a Rana Agency agent stranded inside rebel territory.
He is also a team leader of an anti-terrorism unit of the United Nations.

Masud Rana books at a glance
Some Rana books are little more than direct translations from well known Western titles with only character names being changed i.e. "Shotru Bibhishon" from The Negotiator and "Ondho Shikari" from The Fourth Protocol. But most of the books have changes that resonate with Bangladeshi readers, hence their popularity.

Each Rana paperback opens with these lines:
"An untameable daredevil spy of Bangladesh Counter Intelligence. On secret missions he travels the globe. His life is queer. His movements are mysterious and strange. His heart, a beautiful mix of gentle and tough. Single. He attracts, but refuses to get snared. Wherever he encounters injustice, oppression, and wrong, he fights back. Every step he takes is shadowed by danger, fear, and the risk of death.Come, let us acquaint ourselves with this daring, always hip, young man. In a flash, he will lift us out of the monotony of a mundane life to an awesome world of our dreams. You are invited. Thank you."

The series is made up of 469 books (321 novels and 6 short stories), with 125 stories in two volumes and 11 stories in three volumes, a book containing one short story, and a book containing a collection of 5 stories, making a total of 469 books published as follows:

References

External links
Official Facebook Group of Publisher
Official website of Publisher

 
Fictional people educated at Eton College